Wild Gods is the fifth studio album by The Number Twelve Looks Like You and their first album in a decade due to their six-year split. It was released on September 20, 2019 through Overlord Music, with its first single "Ruin the Smile" released on July 16, 2019.

Track listing

Personnel
The Number Twelve Looks Like You
 Jesse Korman – vocals
 Alexis Pareja – guitar
 DJ Scully – bass
 Michael Kadnar – drums

References

2019 albums
The Number Twelve Looks Like You albums